The 2002 Men's Hockey World Cup was the 10th edition of the Hockey World Cup, a men's field hockey tournament. It was held from 24 February to 9 March 2002 in Kuala Lumpur, Malaysia.

Germany won their first title after defeating Australia 2–1 in the final. Netherlands won the third place match by defeating South Korea 3–2 with a golden goal.

For this tournament, the participating nations were increased from the standard 12 (as in the 5 previous editions) to 16 and each squad could consist of 18 players instead of the normal 16 after the FIH considered the hot and humid conditions in Malaysia.

Qualification
Each of the continental champions from five confederations and the host nation received an automatic berth. The European confederation received one extra quota based upon the FIH World Rankings. Pakistan and England qualified as fourth and sixth team in final ranking at the 2000 Summer Olympics, completing the final line-up alongside the seven teams from the Qualifier.

Squads

Umpires
The International Hockey Federation appointed 20 umpires for this tournament:

Xavier Adell (ESP)
Santiago Deo (ESP)
Henrik Ehlers (DEN)
Peter Elders (NED)
David Gentles (AUS)
Steve Graham (WAL)
Murray Grime (AUS)
Han Jin-soo (KOR)
Hamish Jamson (ENG)
Jason McCracken (NZL)
Clive McMurray (RSA)
Raymond O'Connor (IRL)
Sumesh Putra (CAN)
Mahmood Butt Raashed (PAK)
Edmundo Saladino (ARG)
Amarjit Singh (MAS)
Satinder Kumar (IND)
Pedro Teixeira (POR)
Richard Wolter (GER)
John Wright (RSA)

Group stage
All times are Malaysia Time (UTC+08:00)

Pool A

Pool B

Classification round

Thirteenth to sixteenth place classification

Crossover

Fifteenth and sixteenth place

Thirteenth and fourteenth place

Ninth to twelfth place classification

Crossover

Eleventh and twelfth place

Ninth and tenth place

Fifth to eighth place classification

Crossover

Seventh and eighth place

Fifth and sixth place

First to fourth place classification

Semifinals

Third and fourth place

Final

Awards

Statistics

Final standings

Goalscorers

References

External links
Official FIH website

 
Hockey World Cup Men
World Cup
International field hockey competitions hosted by Malaysia
Men's Hockey World Cup
2000s in Kuala Lumpur
Sports competitions in Kuala Lumpur
Hockey World Cup Men
Hockey World Cup Men